The communauté de communes Cœur du Pays Fort was created on December 4, 2002, and was located in the Cher département of the Centre-Val de Loire  region of France. It was created in January 2003. It was merged into the new Communauté de communes Pays Fort Sancerrois Val de Loire in January 2017.

The Communauté de communes comprised the following communes:

Assigny 
Barlieu
Concressault
Dampierre-en-Crot 
Jars 
Le Noyer
Subligny 
Sury-ès-Bois 
Thou 
Vailly-sur-Sauldre
Villegenon

References 

Coeur du Pays Fort